Zeuzera multistrigata is a moth of the family Cossidae. It is found in India, Nepal, Myanmar, Bangladesh, Sri Lanka, Vietnam, Thailand, China, Korea, Russia, Japan and Taiwan.

The wingspan is 35 mm for males and 70 mm for females.

The larvae feed on Casuarina equisetifolia.

Subspecies
Zeuzera multistrigata multistrigata (India, Pakistan, Nepal, China, Taiwan, Myanmar, Bangladesh, Sri Lanka, Vietnam, Thailand)
Zeuzera multistrigata leuconota Butler, 1881 (Japan, south-eastern Russia, north-eastern China, Korea)

References

Moths described in 1881
Zeuzerinae
Moths of Japan
Taxa named by Frederic Moore